Imran Aslam (1952 – 2 December 2022) was a Pakistani journalist, screenwriter and media personality from Pakistan.

Early life and career
Imran Aslam was born in Madras (Now Chennai, India) in 1952. He studied in London in the 70s in London School of Economics.

Before he turned to journalism, he worked for Sheikh Zayed bin Sultan Al Nahyan of the UAE. He began his journalistic career as the editor of an English language newspaper The Star in the 1980s. In the 1990s, he was editor of The News, a Karachi English daily newspaper.
 
In 2015, he became the Group President of GEO Television Network, a subsidiary of Jang Group of Newspapers.

"During his tenure as president, Geo Network launched Geo News channel, Geo Entertainment channel, Geo Super channel, Aag channel, Geo Kahani channel and Geo Tez channel."

Aslam was the president of Geo TV Network from 2002.

Personal life and death
Aslam was married to cricket journalist Farishteh Aslam.

Imran Aslam died on 2 December 2022, at the age of 70.

Notable work

Films
 Parey Hut Love

Television
 Khaleej
 Dastak
 Bisaat
 Rozy
 Mor Mahal (concept)

See also
Mir Shakil ur Rehman
Mir Ibrahim Rahman
Mir Khalil ur Rehman
Daily Jang
List of Pakistani journalists

References

External links
Homepage of Daily Jang newspaper
Homepage of Geo TV

1952 births
2022 deaths
Pakistani male journalists
Government College University, Lahore alumni
Alumni of the London School of Economics
Alumni of SOAS University of London
Journalists from Karachi
Pakistani expatriates in the United Arab Emirates
Pakistani television executives